Flight 451 may refer to:

Japan Air System Flight 451, crashed on April 18, 1993
Helikopter Service Flight 451, crashed on 8 September 1997

0451